Fred Heismann is an electrical engineer at JDS Uniphase Corp. in Colts Neck, New Jersey. He was named a Fellow of the Institute of Electrical and Electronics Engineers (IEEE) in 2014 for his contributions to understanding, control of, and mitigation of polarization effects in fiberoptic communication systems.

References

20th-century births
Living people
American electrical engineers
Fellow Members of the IEEE
Year of birth missing (living people)